Faye Tunnicliffe (born 9 December 1998) is a South African cricketer who plays as a wicket-keeper and right-handed batter. In August 2018, she was named in the South Africa Women's squad for their series against the West Indies Women. She made her Women's Twenty20 International cricket (WT20I) debut for South Africa against West Indies Women on 24 September 2018.

In November 2018, she was added to South Africa's squad for the 2018 ICC Women's World Twenty20 tournament, replacing Trisha Chetty, who was ruled out of the squad due to an injury. In January 2019, she was named in South Africa's squad for their series against Sri Lanka. She made her Women's One Day International cricket (WT20I) debut for South Africa against Sri Lanka Women on 11 February 2019.

In February 2019, Cricket South Africa named her as one of the players in the Powerade Women's National Academy intake for 2019. In September 2019, she was named in the Devnarain XI squad for the inaugural edition of the Women's T20 Super League in South Africa. On 23 July 2020, Tunnicliffe was named in South Africa's 24-woman squad to begin training in Pretoria, ahead of their tour to England.

In April 2021, she was part of the South African Emerging Women's squad that toured Bangladesh. In August 2021, she was also named in the South African Emerging team for their series against Thailand.

References

External links
 
 

1998 births
Living people
Place of birth missing (living people)
South African women cricketers
South Africa women One Day International cricketers
South Africa women Twenty20 International cricketers
Boland women cricketers
Western Province women cricketers